Vimal Singh Mahavidyalay is situated in Itahara Uparwar on the Jangiganj-Dhantulsi road at Gyanpur tehsil, Sant Ravidas Nagar district, Uttar Pradesh, India. The nearest railway station is Gyanpur Road,  distant.

Subject 
Mahatma Gandhi Kashi Vidyapeeth in the college are recognised in the following seven subjects.

 Hindi literature
 English Literature
 Sanskrit literature
 Political Science
 Education
 Sociology
 History
Science faculty------
 Zoology
 Botany
 Physics
 Chemistry
 Maths

References 

http://scholarship.up.nic.in/schlronline/CollegeProcess/Inst_login.aspx
http://education.indiaforyou.in/directory/listing/vimal-singh-mahavidyalaya-itaharasant-ravidas-nagarbhadohi-id-c-51104

http://www.helpuindia.com/college/vimal-singh-mahavidyalaya-11374

Women's universities and colleges in Uttar Pradesh
Mahatma Gandhi Kashi Vidyapith
Bhadohi district
Educational institutions established in 2013
2013 establishments in Uttar Pradesh